The 2018 Zimbabwe Premier Soccer League is the 39th season of top-tier football in Zimbabwe. The season was initially scheduled to begin on 10 March 2018, but was postponed to 17 March 2018.

Herentals College, Bulawayo Chiefs, Nichrut F.C., and Mutare City Rovers were all promoted before the start of the season.

Standings

References

2018 in African association football leagues
Zimbabwe Premier Soccer League